Empties is a 2007 film directed by Jan Svěrák and written by his father Zdeněk Svěrák, who also stars in the film. It was released first in the Czech Republic in March 2007. The film is a comedy from the same team which made Kolya.

Plot
Josef Tkaloun is an elderly teacher at a high school in Prague who cannot control his anger when his pupils misbehave in his poetry class. He quits his job and despite his wife urging him to retire, becomes a cycle courier. After an inevitable accident, he still refuses to stay at home and takes a job in the local Žižkov supermarket. He works behind a counter, recycling glass beer bottles. There he begins to flirt with the customers and matchmake both for an old friend and for the man he works with. His own flirtations (and sexually charged dreams) almost get him into trouble with his wife, so he resolves to reignite the passion in his marriage by celebrating his wedding anniversary with a hot air balloon ride. The scary balloon ride, ending in crash, revitalizes the relationship.

Cast
 Zdeněk Svěrák as Josef Tkaloun
 Tatiana Vilhelmová as Helenka, his daughter
 Daniela Kolářová as Eliška Tkalounová
 Jiří Macháček as Landa, his friend
 Pavel Landovský as Řezáč

Awards
Zdeněk Svěrák received a Special Jury Mention for the screenplay at the 2007 Karlovy Vary International Film Festival
The film received the Audience Award at 2007 Ljubljana International Film Festival
The film received the Gold Dolphin award for Best Film at the Festroia International Film Festival in 2008.
The film received the Gold Prize for Best Film at Damascus International Film Festival in 2008.

Home media
The DVD was released in October 2007. It includes extra scenes, a photo gallery, the storyboard and comics.

References

External links
 

2007 films
2007 comedy films
2000s Czech-language films
Films directed by Jan Svěrák
Films about educators
Films about old age
Films set in Prague
Czech comedy films
Films with screenplays by Zdeněk Svěrák